Events from the year 1955 in Ireland.

Incumbents
 President: Seán T. O'Kelly
 Taoiseach: John A. Costello (FG)
 Tánaiste: William Norton (Lab)
 Minister for Finance: Gerard Sweetman (FG)
 Chief Justice: Conor Maguire
 Dáil: 15th
 Seanad: 8th

Events
 6 January – The National Farmers' Association was formed during a meeting of 1,200 people in Dublin.
 14 January – Tony O'Reilly was named in the Irish rugby squad for his first cap in an international against France.
 17 March (Saint Patrick's Day) – The Church of Ireland hallowed Trim Cathedral.
 4 July – Denis Larkin was elected Lord Mayor of Dublin defeating 73-year-old Alfie Byrne.
 21 July – The BBC brought its Divis television transmitter into service, its first permanent facility serving Northern Ireland, marking the launch of a television service for Northern Ireland; the 35-kilowatt transmissions could also be readily received in much of Ireland.
 September – United States Senator John F. Kennedy and his wife Jacqueline visited Dublin for two days.
 29 November – Publication of the Greyhound Industry Bill paved the way for the establishment of the greyhound board, Bord na gCon.
 14 December – Ireland was admitted to the United Nations. Frederick Boland was appointed as its first ambassador.

Arts and literature
 March – English language publication of Beckett's novel Molloy (in Paris and New York).
 3 August – English language première of Samuel Beckett's play Waiting for Godot, directed by Peter Hall, at the Arts Theatre in London.
 28 October – Irish première of Waiting for Godot at the Pike Theatre in Dublin.
 12 December – The Cork Opera House at Emmet Palace was destroyed by fire.
 Sigerson Clifford published his poetry collection, Ballads of a Bogman.
 Michael Sheehy's modern history Divided We Stand: A Study In Partition was published.

Sports

Association football
League of Ireland
Winners: St Patrick's Athletic

FAI Cup
Winners: Shamrock Rovers 1–0 Drumcondra.

Births
 15 January – Paddy Burke, Fine Gael Senator.
 18 January – Fergus Martin, artist.
 29 January – Liam Reilly, rock singer-songwriter (died 2021).
 2 February – Dermot Ahern, Fianna Fáil TD for Louth and Cabinet Minister.
 15 March – John McGuinness, Fianna Fáil TD for Carlow–Kilkenny.
 27 March – Patrick McCabe, novelist.
 29 March – Brendan Gleeson, actor.
 1 April
 Bobby Aylward, Fianna Fáil TD for Carlow–Kilkenny.
 Joe O'Reilly, Fine Gael Senator.
 7 April – Kevin Fennelly, Kilkenny hurler.
 14 April – Simon Crowe, drummer with The Boomtown Rats.
 17 April – Austin Brady, footballer.
 24 April – Eamon Gilmore, Labour Party TD for Dún Laoghaire, leader of the Labour Party.
 28 April – Mae Sexton, Progressive Democrats TD.
 16 May – Páidí Ó Sé, Kerry Gaelic footballer and manager.
 23 May
Mary Black, folk singer.
Luka Bloom, singer-songwriter and guitarist.
 30 May – Colm Tóibín, novelist and critic.
 20 June – Aonghus McAnally, broadcast producer and presenter, actor, guitar player, billiards champion and magician.
 5 July – Sebastian Barry, playwright, novelist and poet.
 6 July – William Wall, novelist, poet and short story writer.
 20 July – Jem Finer, musician and composer.
 16 August – James Reilly, Fine Gael TD for Dublin North and Minister for Health.
 15 September – Brendan O'Carroll, comedian.
 24 November – Jerry Holland, Munster rugby union player and coach (died 2022).
 1 December – Pat Spillane, Kerry Gaelic footballer.
 2 December – Joachim Kelly, Offaly hurler.
 11 December – John Fenton, Cork hurler.
 29 December – Pat Loughrey, Controller of BBC Northern Ireland, Director of BBC Nations and Regions and academic.
Full date unknown
 John Allen, Cork hurler and manager.
 John Callinan, Clare hurler.
 Michael Gleeson, Tipperary hurler.
 Peter Wyse Jackson, Director of the National Botanic Gardens, Glasnevin, Dublin.
 Maighread Ní Dhomhnaill, traditional singer.
 Sean Power, Member of the States of Jersey.

Deaths
 22 January – Moira O'Neill, poet (born in 1864).
 February – John Dulanty, diplomat (born in 1883).
 12 February – Thomas J. Moore, actor (born in 1883).
 13 March – Evie Hone, painter and stained glass artist (born in 1894).
 26 March – Thomas Farren, elected to Seanad Éireann in 1922 and 1931, member of the Labour Party.
 4 May – Michael Colivet, manager Shannon Foundry, member of 1st Dáil (Anti Treaty), representing Limerick (born in 1882).
 14 May – Robert Quigg, soldier, recipient of the Victoria Cross for gallantry in 1916 at the Battle of the Somme (born in 1885).
 16 June – Stanislaus Joyce, scholar and writer, brother of James Joyce (born in 1884).
 11 July – Frank Duffy, labour leader in the United States (born in 1861).
 15 July – James Dolan, merchant, member of 1st Dáil (Pro Treaty), representing Leitrim (born in 1882).
 16 July – May Guinness, writer (born 1863).
 18 July – Billy McCandless, footballer and football manager (born in 1893).
 14 September – Kathleen Lynn, physician and politician (born in 1874).
 26 October – Michael Staines, Sinn Féin TD,  member of 1st Dáil, first Commissioner of the Garda Síochána (born in 1885).

References

 
1950s in Ireland
Ireland
Years of the 20th century in Ireland